Ann-Marie Fagerström (born 1953), is a Swedish social democratic politician. She was a member of the Riksdag from 1994 to 2006.

External links
Ann-Marie Fagerström at the Riksdag website

1953 births
Living people
Members of the Riksdag from the Social Democrats
Women members of the Riksdag
Members of the Riksdag 2002–2006
21st-century Swedish women politicians